The 2017 UCI Urban Cycling World Championships was the first edition of the UCI Urban Cycling World Championships and was held from 6 to 12 November 2017 in Chengdu, China.

The event comprised the 2017 UCI World Championships in BMX freestyle, cross-country eliminator, and trials. Prior to 2017, the UCI World Championships in cross-country eliminator and trials were held as part of the UCI Mountain Bike & Trials World Championships. There were no previous UCI World Championships in BMX freestyle.

Medal summary

Men's events

Women's events

Team events

Medal table

See also
2017 UCI Mountain Bike World Championships
2021 UCI Urban Cycling World Championships

References

External links

Official website 
The event on the UCI website

UCI Urban Cycling World Championships
International sports competitions hosted by China
UCI Mountain Bike World Championships
2017 in Chinese sport